The Fifth cabinet of Ólafur Thors in Iceland was formed 20 November 1959.

Cabinet
During the first reshuffle of 14 September 1961, Bjarni Benediktsson replaced Ólafur Thors as Prime Minister. Jóhann Hafstein replaced Bjarni Benediktsson as Minister of Health and Social Security, Minister of Industry and Minister of Justice and Ecclesiastical Affairs. On 1 January 1962, the second reshuffle reverted the cabinet changes back to the original composition.

Composition

|-
! Colspan=6|

|-
! Colspan=6|

|-
! Colspan=6|

|-
! Colspan=6|

|-
! Colspan=6|

|-
! Colspan=6|

See also
Government of Iceland
Cabinet of Iceland

References

Olafur Thors, Fifth cabinet of
Olafur Thors, Fifth cabinet of
Olafur Thors, Fifth cabinet of
Cabinets established in 1959
Cabinets disestablished in 1963
Independence Party (Iceland)